30 de Febrero is the fifth studio album by American Latin pop duo Ha*Ash, released on 1 December 2017 Sony Music Latin. It is the band's first studio album in six years, after of their previous album, A Tiempo (2011). The album features artists Prince Royce and Abraham Mateo. Ha*Ash assumed an integral role in the album's production and collaborated with several producers including George Noriega, Matt Rad, Joe London and Edgar Barrera.

The album was preceded by the release of four singles. The first, "100 Años" featuring Prince Royce was released 13 October 2017. In November 2017, The second single, "No Pasa Nada", was released on 8 March 2018. The other singles released were, "Eso No Va a Suceder" and "¿Qué Me Faltó?". Ha*Ash released six lyric; "Ojalá", "30 de Febrero" and "Eso No Va a Suceder". The 4th, 5th and 6th lyric videos came out on 1 December, which were "Paleta", "No Pasa Nada", and "Llueve Sobre Mojado", which were all released on the same day as the album.

To promote the album, the band embarked on Gira 100 años contigo, which began at the Quinta Vergara Amphitheater in Viña del Mar, Chile on 24 February 2018. Footage from the concert at the Auditorio Nacional in Mexico were recorded and i will released on a CD/DVD, entitled Ha*Ash: En Vivo, in 2019.

Background and production 
The follow up to Primera Fila: Hecho Realidad, the album introduces new genres to the duo. On 13 January 2018 it was confirmed that Ha*Ash will be holding concerts for their new recent album. They will perform once again at the Auditorio Josefa Ortiz de Dominguez on 27 April 2018. They will set to tour in March 2018 for their tour as well. The lead single "100 Años" with Prince Royce; marks the first time the duo dwells into the genre of reggaeton and urban music. Ha*Ash assumed an integral role in the album's production and collaborated with several producers including George Noriega, Matt Rad, Joe London and Edgar Barrera. The album, like Ha*Ash' previous records, contains many different genres of music, including rhythms closer urban beats.

Release and promotion 
It is the band's first studio album in six years, after of their previous album, A Tiempo (2011), and it was recorded in 2017 in Miami, United States. In the United States and Mexico, the standard edition CD of the album was released on 1 December 2017, under the Sony Music Latin label. The CD/DVD edition was released the same day.

Singles 
The first single from the album was "100 Años" with Prince Royce; released on 13 October 2017, The track peaked at number 50 in the Latin Pop Songs, and number 24 in the Latin Airplay charts in the United States. In Mexico, the song peaked at number one on the Mexico Espanol Airplay, and Monitor Latino. "100 Años" was certified platinum and gold in Mexico and gold in the United States. The second single "No Pasa Nada" was released on 8 March 2018, peaked at number 13 in the Mexico Airplay, number 4 in the Mexico Espanol Airplay and number two on the Monitor Latino charts in Mexico. On 1 February 2019, it was announced that No Pasa Nada had been certified Platinum.

On 8 August 2018, they released the third single from the album, "Eso No Va a Suceder". The song peaked at number 34 in the Latin Pop Songs charts in the United States and number one of the Mexican Espanol Airplay and Monitor Latino in Mexico. In September 2019 the song was certified Platinum in Mexico. The video for this single was released on 8 August 2018. On 4 January 2019, the track "¿Qué Me Faltó?" was released as the album's fourth single and was accompanied by a music video. The clip was recorded in the beach in Oaxaca, Mexico. It was under the direction by Toño Tzinzun. The track peaked two on the Monitor Latino in Mexico.

Other songs 
Then as for the month of November Ha*Ash released "Ojalá" lyric video. It was directed by Diego Álvarez. The song takes place in an office setting and has the vibe of a pop song, that shows many texts between the girls and the guy who is an ex lover of Ashley. On 1 February 2019 the song was certified gold in Mexico. Same month of November they released the song "30 de Febrero" which featured Abraham Mateo in the lyric video. The song is a break up song and has a colorful vibe with having Abraham their ex lover who is wanting another chance. The song is a classy and upbeat. On 1 February 2019 the song was certified gold in Mexico. On 1 December, Ha*Ash were released lyric videos of "Paleta" and "Llueve Sobre Mojado". Both songs, is musically complete with pop beats and a reggaeton sound.

Tour 

To promote the album, Ha*Ash embarked on a world concert tour during 2018 and 2020. The "Gira 100 años contigo" is a concert tour performed by Ha*Ash. The tour was announced by Ha*Ash on her social media in November 2017. The tour will begin in the National Auditorium of Mexico City with 3 shows. At some shows, Ha*Ash covered songs such as "Adios Amor" by Christian Nodal. The setlist includes songs of the new album but also older singles from Ha*Ash, Mundos Opuestos, Habitación Doble, A Tiempo and Primera fila: Hecho Realidad.

The show filmed at the Auditorio Nacional in Mexico City, Mexico on 11 November 2018, entitled Ha*Ash: En Vivo, was released for sales on 6 December 2019.

Commercial performance 
The album peaked at #3 in the Mexican album charts, #11 in the US Billboard Latin Pop Albums and #11 in the US Billboard Latin pop sales. On 14 February 2018 the album was certified gold in Mexico. On 11 November 2018 the album eventually was certified Platinum in Mexico.

Track listing 

Notes
  signifies a co-producer

Credits and personnel
Credits adapted from the album's liner notes.

Musicians

 Ashley Grace – vocals 
 Hanna Nicole – vocals 
 Abraham Mateo: vocals 
 Prince Royce: vocals 
 Matt Rad: background vocals , keyboards , guitar 
 Santiago Hernández: keyboards 
 Rob Wells: keyboards 
 George Noriega: keyboards , guitar , bass , brass 
 Matt Rad: drums 
 Pete Wallace: keyboards 
 Edgar Barrera: ukelele , keyboards , guitar , bass 
 Joe Spargur: ukelele , keyboards , guitar , bass , brass 
 Pablo De La Loza: keyboards , guitar , bass 
 Tim Mitchell: mandoline , guitar

Production

 Hanna Nicole: executive director, executive producer 
 George Noriega: producer , programmer , recording engineer , additional mixing assistant 
 Edge: producer , recording engineer , programmer 
 Joe London: producer , recording engineer , programmer 
 Matt Rad: producer , programmer , mixing 
 Emily Lazar: mastering engineering 
 Adrián Morales: assistant engineering 
 Rafael Vergara: programmer 
 Santiago Hernández: programmer 
 Rob Wells: programmer , recording engineer 
 Diego Contento: recording engineer 
 Dave Clauss: mixing engineer 
 Jean Rodríguez: vocal producer , vocal engineer , recording engineer 
 Pete Wallace: programmer , recording engineer 
 Luis Barrera Jr: mixing 
 Francesco Grieco: assistant engineering 
 Pablo De La Loza: programmer , recording engineer 
 Gustavo Celis: mixing

Design

 Isabel de Jesús: A&R
 Charlie García: A&R
 Álex Gallardo: A&R
 Olga Laris: graphic and logo design

Charts

Weekly charts

Year-end charts

Certifications

Release history

References 

2017 albums
Ha*Ash albums
Spanish-language albums
Sony Music Latin albums